David Malone (born 10 March 1964) is an Irish sports shooter. He competed in the men's trap event at the 2000 Summer Olympics.

References

External links
 

1964 births
Living people
Irish male sport shooters
Olympic shooters of Ireland
Shooters at the 2000 Summer Olympics
Sportspeople from Dublin (city)
20th-century Irish people